Grégory Guilvert (born 8 May 1982) is a French racing driver currently competing in the TCR International Series. Having previously competed in the Blancpain Endurance Series, Eurocup Mégane Trophy & FIA GT3 European Championship amongst others.

Racing career
Guilvert began his career in 2002 in karting. In 2003 he switched to the French Peugeot 206 Cup, he raced there up until 2004 and won the Junior Class title that year. He switched to the French Supertouring Championship for 2005, taking a single victory on his way to finish 3rd in the standings. He returned to the French Peugeot 206 Cup for 2006, finishing 2nd in the championship standings that year. For 2007 he switched to the French Peugeot THP Spider Cup, ultimately winning the championship in 2009. In 2010 he switched to the FFSA GT Championship, finishing 8th in 2011 & 2012 in the championship standings. He also took part in the FIA GT3 European Championship in 2010, racing their up until 2012. In 2011 he raced in the Eurocup Mégane Trophy alongside his participation in the Blancpain Endurance Series, he finished 3rd in the Pro-Cup in 2014. He also raced in the Porsche Carrera Cup France championship in 2015, finishing 15th in the standings. For 2016 he stayed in the Blancpain Endurance Series, now named Blancpain GT Series Endurance Cup.

In April 2016 it was announced that he would race in the TCR International Series, driving a Peugeot 308 Racing Cup for Sébastien Loeb Racing.

Racing record

Complete TCR International Series results
(key) (Races in bold indicate pole position) (Races in italics indicate fastest lap)

Complete NASCAR results
(key) (Bold – Pole position. Italics – Fastest lap. * – Most laps led. ^ – Most positions gained)

Racecar Euro Series - Elite

References

External links
 

1982 births
Living people
TCR International Series drivers
NASCAR drivers
Sportspeople from Melun
French racing drivers
Phoenix Racing drivers
Sébastien Loeb Racing drivers
G-Drive Racing drivers
W Racing Team drivers
Blancpain Endurance Series drivers
Saintéloc Racing drivers
Boutsen Ginion Racing drivers
Le Mans Cup drivers